The Cincinnati Reds' 1996 season consisted of the Cincinnati Reds attempting to win the National League Central Division.

Offseason
December 7, 1995: Chris Sabo was signed as a free agent with the Cincinnati Reds.
January 2, 1996: Eric Davis was signed as a free agent with the Cincinnati Reds.
January 9, 1996: Mike Kelly was traded by the Atlanta Braves to the Cincinnati Reds for a player to be named later and Chad Fox. The Cincinnati Reds sent Ray King (June 11, 1996) to the Atlanta Braves to complete the trade.
January 20, 1996: Vince Coleman signed as a free agent with the Cincinnati Reds.
February 26, 1996: Joe Oliver was signed as a free agent with the Cincinnati Reds.
February 26, 1996: Damon Berryhill was released by the Cincinnati Reds.

Regular season
 Opening Day (April 1) – Seven pitches into the first game of the season, at Riverfront Stadium in Cincinnati, home plate umpire John McSherry collapses on the field and dies of a massive heart attack. The game between the Reds and Montreal Expos is postponed, along with the rest of the games scheduled for that day. Reds owner Marge Schott later comes under fire for wanting the game in Cincinnati to continue despite the tragedy (and against the wishes of the players on both teams), saying that she felt "cheated" when it was canceled.

Opening Day lineup

April 1 (game postponed)
 Vince Coleman, LF
 Hal Morris, 1B
 Barry Larkin, SS
 Reggie Sanders, RF
 Eddie Taubensee, C
 Bret Boone, 2B
 Mike Kelly, CF
 Jeff Branson, 3B
 Pete Schourek, P
Source: 

April 2
 Eric Davis, LF
 Eric Owens, 2B
 Barry Larkin, SS
 Reggie Sanders, RF
 Chris Sabo, 3B
 Hal Morris, 1B
 Mike Kelly, CF
 Joe Oliver, C
 Pete Schourek, P
Source: 

Note: the two lineups have multiple differences, as the Expos had scheduled right-hander Pedro Martínez to start on April 1; he was replaced by left-hander Jeff Fassero for the April 2 game.

Season standings

Record vs. opponents

Game log

|- bgcolor="ccffcc"
| 1 || April 2 || Expos || 4–1 || Schourek (1–0) || Fassero || Moore (1) || 53,136 || 1–0
|- bgcolor="ffbbbb"
| 2 || April 3 || Expos || 4–8 || Veres || Shaw (0–1) || — || 19,104 || 1–1
|- bgcolor="ffbbbb"
| 3 || April 4 || Expos || 2–10 || Paniagua || Burba (0–1) || — || 17,067 || 1–2
|- bgcolor="ccffcc"
| 4 || April 5 || @ Phillies || 6–5 (10) || Shaw (1–1) || Borland || Moore (2) || 17,318 || 2–2
|- bgcolor="ccffcc"
| 5 || April 6 || @ Phillies || 8–4 || Salkeld (1–0) || Hunter || — || 17,958 || 3–2
|- bgcolor="ccffcc"
| 6 || April 8 || Mets || 7–6 || Schourek (2–0) || Jones || Brantley (1) || 17,623 || 4–2
|- bgcolor="ffbbbb"
| 7 || April 9 || Mets || 5–12 || Isringhausen || Smiley (0–1) || Franco || 15,958 || 4–3
|- bgcolor="ccffcc"
| 8 || April 10 || Mets || 9–7 || Pugh (1–0) || Macdonald || Brantley (2) || 16,775 || 5–3
|- bgcolor="ffbbbb"
| 9 || April 11 || Astros || 4–9 || Reynolds || Portugal (0–1) || — || 18,946 || 5–4
|- bgcolor="ffbbbb"
| 10 || April 12 || Astros || 8–10 (10) || Jones || Moore (0–1) || Tabaka || 24,960 || 5–5
|- bgcolor="ccffcc"
| 11 || April 14 || Astros || 5–3 || Schourek (3–0) || Hampton || Brantley (3) || — || 6–5
|- bgcolor="ccffcc"
| 12 || April 14 || Astros || 9–8 || Shaw (2–1) || Young || Brantley (4) || 21,552 || 7–5
|- bgcolor="ccffcc"
| 13 || April 15 || @ Cubs || 3–2 (10) || Moore (1–1) || Patterson || Brantley (5) || 20,395 || 8–5
|- bgcolor="ffbbbb"
| 14 || April 16 || @ Cubs || 3–6 || Trachsel || Portugal (0–2) || — || 11,464 || 8–6
|- bgcolor="ffbbbb"
| 15 || April 17 || @ Cubs || 6–8 (10) || Wendell || Ruffin (0–1) || — || 13,023 || 8–7
|- bgcolor="ffbbbb"
| 16 || April 19 || @ Astros || 5–13 || Brocail || Schourek (3–1) || — || 22,728 || 8–8
|- bgcolor="ccffcc"
| 17 || April 20 || @ Astros || 6–1 || Smiley (1–1) || Drabek || — || 34,098 || 9–8
|- bgcolor="ffbbbb"
| 18 || April 21 || @ Astros || 5–7 || Jones || Brantley (0–1) || — || 27,845 || 9–9
|- bgcolor="ffbbbb"
| 19 || April 22 || @ Mets || 1–5 || Wilson || Portugal (0–3) || — || 14,568 || 9–10
|- bgcolor="ffbbbb"
| 20 || April 23 || @ Mets || 6–8 (10) || Henry || Shaw (2–2) || — || 14,357 || 9–11
|- bgcolor="ffbbbb"
| 21 || April 24 || @ Expos || 6–7 (10) || Dyer || Moore (1–2) || — || 10,126 || 9–12
|- bgcolor="ffbbbb"
| 22 || April 25 || @ Expos || 4–8 || Martinez || Smiley (1–2) || — || 13,067 || 9–13
|- bgcolor="ffbbbb"
| 23 || April 26 || Phillies || 0–2 || Grace || Burba (0–2) || Bottalico || 21,842 || 9–14
|- bgcolor="ffbbbb"
| 24 || April 27 || Phillies || 2–3 || Leiper || Portugal (0–4) || Bottalico || 22,555 || 9–15
|- bgcolor="ffbbbb"
| 25 || April 30 || Pirates || 7–10 || Neagle || Smiley (1–3) || Cordova || 16,243 || 9–16
|-

|- bgcolor="ffbbbb"
| 26 || May 1 || Pirates || 3–4 || Hope || Burba (0–3) || Plesac || 18,197 || 9–17
|- bgcolor="ccffcc"
| 27 || May 3 || @ Giants || 5–3 || McElroy (1–0) || Creek || Brantley (6) || 12,884 || 10–17
|- bgcolor="ccffcc"
| 28 || May 4 || @ Giants || 9–7 || Moore (2–2) || Leiter || Brantley (7) || 18,989 || 11–17
|- bgcolor="ccffcc"
| 29 || May 5 || @ Giants || 12–6 || Smiley (2–3) || VanLandingham || — || 18,052 || 12–17
|- bgcolor="ccffcc"
| 30 || May 7 || Dodgers || 3–2 (12) || Moore (3–2) || Worrell || — || 18,147 || 13–17
|- bgcolor="ccffcc"
| 31 || May 8 || Dodgers || 5–0 || Schourek (4–1) || Park || Shaw (1) || 17,820 || 14–17
|- bgcolor="ccffcc"
| 32 || May 10 || Padres || 8–6 || McElroy (2–0) || Florie || Brantley (8) || 22,508 || 15–17
|- bgcolor="ccffcc"
| 33 || May 11 || Padres || 1–0 || Smiley (3–3) || Hamilton || Brantley (9) || 24,983 || 16–17
|- bgcolor="ffbbbb"
| 34 || May 12 || Padres || 0–5 || Tewksbury || Burba (0–4) || — || 22,786 || 16–18
|- bgcolor="ffbbbb"
| 35 || May 14 || Rockies || 3–5 || Reed || Schourek (4–2) || Ruffin || 20,535 || 16–19
|- bgcolor="ffbbbb"
| 36 || May 17 || @ Braves || 2–8 || Maddux || Smiley (3–4) || — || 40,612 || 16–20
|- bgcolor="ffbbbb"
| 37 || May 18 || @ Braves || 1–2 || Clontz || Ruffin (0–2) || Wohlers || 49,553 || 16–21
|- bgcolor="ffbbbb"
| 38 || May 19 || @ Braves || 5–9 || Smoltz || Schourek (4–3) || Wohlers || 41,153 || 16–22
|- bgcolor="ffbbbb"
| 39 || May 20 || Marlins || 3–5 || Rapp || Burba (0–5) || Nen || 18,023 || 16–23
|- bgcolor="ffbbbb"
| 40 || May 21 || Marlins || 2–3 || Weathers || Salkeld (1–1) || Mathews || 19,534 || 16–24
|- bgcolor="ccffcc"
| 41 || May 22 || Marlins || 4–1 || Smiley (4–4) || Leiter || Brantley (10) || 22,055 || 17–24
|- bgcolor="ccffcc"
| 42 || May 23 || @ Rockies || 7–5 || Carrasco (1–0) || Ruffin || Brantley (11) || 48,040 || 18–24
|- bgcolor="ccffcc"
| 43 || May 24 || @ Rockies || 11–9 || Ruffin (1–2) || Thompson || — || 48,019 || 19–24
|- bgcolor="ffbbbb"
| 44 || May 25 || @ Rockies || 5–7 || Leskanic || Moore (3–3) || — || 48,012 || 19–25
|- bgcolor="ffbbbb"
| 45 || May 27 || @ Marlins || 2–6 || Leiter || Smiley (4–5) || — || 15,919 || 19–26
|- bgcolor="ffbbbb"
| 46 || May 28 || @ Marlins || 2–6 || Brown || Burba (0–6) || Mathews || 14,052 || 19–27
|- bgcolor="ffbbbb"
| 47 || May 31 || Braves || 1–9 || Avery || Schourek (4–4) || — || 33,455 || 19–28
|-

|- bgcolor="ccffcc"
| 48 || June 1 || Braves || 3–2 || Portugal (1–4) || Maddux || Brantley (12) || 34,023 || 20–28
|- bgcolor="ffbbbb"
| 49 || June 2 || Braves || 2–6 || Glavine || Smiley (4–6) || — || 23,482 || 20–29
|- bgcolor="ffbbbb"
| 50 || June 3 || Giants || 3–6 || VanLandingham || Burba (0–7) || — || 20,028 || 20–30
|- bgcolor="ccffcc"
| 51 || June 4 || Giants || 4–1 || Salkeld (2–1) || Watson || Brantley (13) || 28,549 || 21–30
|- bgcolor="ffbbbb"
| 52 || June 5 || Giants || 4–15 || Gardner || Jarvis (0–1) || — || 21,881 || 21–31
|- bgcolor="ccffcc"
| 53 || June 7 || @ Dodgers || 2–1 || Smiley (5–6) || Valdez || Brantley (14) || 35,197 || 22–31
|- bgcolor="ffbbbb"
| 54 || June 8 || @ Dodgers || 4–5 (10) || Worrell || Carrasco (1–1) || — || 44,575 || 22–32
|- bgcolor="ffbbbb"
| 55 || June 9 || @ Dodgers || 2–3 || Nomo || Smith (0–1) || Worrell || 47,847 || 22–33
|- bgcolor="ccffcc"
| 56 || June 10 || @ Padres || 6–3 || Smith (1–1) || Bochtler || Brantley (15) || 41,120 || 23–33
|- bgcolor="ccffcc"
| 57 || June 11 || @ Padres || 4–1 || Jarvis (1–1) || Valenzuela || Brantley (16) || 12,029 || 24–33
|- bgcolor="ccffcc"
| 58 || June 12 || @ Padres || 9–4 || Smiley (6–6) || Florie || — || 11,411 || 25–33
|- bgcolor="ffbbbb"
| 59 || June 14 || Expos || 1–6 || Martinez || Portugal (1–5) || — || 26,691 || 25–34
|- bgcolor="ffbbbb"
| 60 || June 15 || Expos || 5–6 || Rueter || Burba (0–8) || Rojas || 32,833 || 25–35
|- bgcolor="ccffcc"
| 61 || June 16 || Expos || 7–0 || Salkeld (3–1) || Cormier || — || 25,657 || 26–35
|- bgcolor="ffbbbb"
| 62 || June 17 || @ Astros || 4–5 || Young || Shaw (2–3) || Jones || 24,977 || 26–36
|- bgcolor="ccffcc"
| 63 || June 18 || @ Astros || 6–4 (10) || Brantley (1–1) || Hernandez || — || 20,505 || 27–36
|- bgcolor="ccffcc"
| 64 || June 19 || @ Astros || 10–7 || Portugal (2–5) || Hampton || Brantley (17) || 38,218 || 28–36
|- bgcolor="ccffcc"
| 65 || June 20 || @ Mets || 5–3 || Burba (1–8) || Jones || Shaw (2) || 16,994 || 29–36
|- bgcolor="ffbbbb"
| 66 || June 21 || @ Mets || 4–9 || Dipoto || Salkeld (3–2) || Mlicki || 19,432 || 29–37
|- bgcolor="ffbbbb"
| 67 || June 22 || @ Mets || 2–5 || Clark || Schourek (4–5) || Franco || 24,589 || 29–38
|- bgcolor="ccffcc"
| 68 || June 23 || @ Mets || 2–1 || Smiley (7–6) || Person || Brantley (18) || 18,593 || 30–38
|- bgcolor="ccffcc"
| 69 || June 24 || Phillies || 7–0 || Portugal (3–5) || Schilling || — || 20,835 || 31–38
|- bgcolor="ccffcc"
| 70 || June 25 || Phillies || 9–1 || Burba (2–8) || Quirico || — || — || 32–38
|- bgcolor="ccffcc"
| 71 || June 25 || Phillies || 3–1 || Jarvis (2–1) || Mimbs || Smith (1) || 23,369 || 33–38
|- bgcolor="ccffcc"
| 72 || June 26 || Phillies || 4–2 || Salkeld (4–2) || Williams || Brantley (19) || 32,286 || 34–38
|- bgcolor="ccffcc"
| 73 || June 28 || Cubs || 7–4 || Smiley (8–6) || Castillo || Smith (2) || 27,864 || 35–38
|- bgcolor="ccffcc"
| 74 || June 29 || Cubs || 9–5 || Portugal (4–5) || Bullinger || — || 32,273 || 36–38
|- bgcolor="ffbbbb"
| 75 || June 30 || Cubs || 0–6 || Trachsel || Burba (2–9) || — || 30,352 || 36–39
|-

|- bgcolor="ccffcc"
| 76 || July 1 || @ Cardinals || 8–5 || Carrasco (2–1) || Benes || Brantley (20) || 27,221 || 37–39
|- bgcolor="ffbbbb"
| 77 || July 2 || @ Cardinals || 3–4 || Honeycutt || Smith (1–2) || Eckersley || 29,074 || 37–40
|- bgcolor="ffbbbb"
| 78 || July 3 || @ Cardinals || 0–4 || Osborne || Smiley (8–7) || — || 32,658 || 37–41
|- bgcolor="ccffcc"
| 79 || July 4 || @ Cubs || 2–1 || Portugal (5–5) || Bullinger || Brantley (21) || 38,047 || 38–41
|- bgcolor="ccffcc"
| 80 || July 5 || @ Cubs || 3–0 || Burba (3–9) || Trachsel || Brantley (22) || 40,743 || 39–41
|- bgcolor="ffbbbb"
| 81 || July 6 || @ Cubs || 2–6 || Patterson || Carrasco (2–2) || — || 38,690 || 39–42
|- bgcolor="ffbbbb"
| 82 || July 7 || @ Cubs || 6–7 (13) || Sturtze || Ruffin (1–3) || — || 36,352 || 39–43
|- bgcolor="ffbbbb"
| 83 || July 11 || Pirates || 3–5 || Neagle || Smiley (8–8) || Plesac || 24,670 || 39–44
|- bgcolor="ccffcc"
| 84 || July 12 || Pirates || 5–2 || Portugal (6–5) || Darwin || Brantley (23) || 27,708 || 40–44
|- bgcolor="ccffcc"
| 85 || July 13 || Pirates || 3–0 || Jarvis (3–1) || Lieber || — || 32,119 || 41–44
|- bgcolor="ccffcc"
| 86 || July 14 || Pirates || 7–6 || Burba (4–9) || Wagner || Brantley (24) || 26,619 || 42–44
|- bgcolor="ffbbbb"
| 87 || July 15 || Cardinals || 3–8 || Morgan || Salkeld (4–3) || — || 38,450 || 42–45
|- bgcolor="ffbbbb"
| 88 || July 16 || Cardinals || 4–5 || Osborne || Shaw (2–4) || Eckersley || 23,370 || 42–46
|- bgcolor="ffbbbb"
| 89 || July 17 || Cardinals || 4–6 || Benes || Portugal (6–6) || Eckersley || 28,879 || 42–47
|- bgcolor="ffbbbb"
| 90 || July 18 || @ Pirates || 3–8 || Lieber || Jarvis (3–2) || — || 12,669 || 42–48
|- bgcolor="ccffcc"
| 91 || July 19 || @ Pirates || 11–3 || Burba (5–9) || Wagner || — || 17,153 || 43–48
|- bgcolor="ccffcc"
| 92 || July 20 || @ Pirates || 9–3 || Salkeld (5–3) || Miceli || — || 26,378 || 44–48
|- bgcolor="ffbbbb"
| 93 || July 21 || @ Pirates || 4–6 || Neagle || Smiley (8–9) || Plesac || 23,117 || 44–49
|- bgcolor="ccffcc"
| 94 || July 22 || @ Phillies || 5–2 || Portugal (7–6) || Mulholland || Brantley (25) || — || 45–49
|- bgcolor="ccffcc"
| 95 || July 22 || @ Phillies || 5–3 || Smith (2–2) || Ryan || Brantley (26) || 22,808 || 46–49
|- bgcolor="ccffcc"
| 96 || July 23 || @ Phillies || 5–3 || Jarvis (4–2) || Mimbs || — || 23,100 || 47–49
|- bgcolor="ccffcc"
| 97 || July 24 || @ Phillies || 3–1 || Burba (6–9) || Williams || Brantley (27) || 27,352 || 48–49
|- bgcolor="ccffcc"
| 98 || July 26 || Mets || 7–4 || Smiley (9–9) || Wilson || — || 30,011 || 49–49
|- bgcolor="ccffcc"
| 99 || July 27 || Mets || 7–5 || Service (1–0) || Clark || Brantley (28) || 26,880 || 50–49
|- bgcolor="ffbbbb"
| 100 || July 28 || Mets || 1–7 || Jones || Jarvis (4–3) || — || 25,094 || 50–50
|- bgcolor="ffbbbb"
| 101 || July 29 || Astros || 1–2 || Hampton || Portugal (7–7) || Wagner || 22,163 || 50–51
|- bgcolor="ccffcc"
| 102 || July 30 || Astros || 5–4 (10) || Shaw (3–4) || Clark || — || 27,015 || 51–51
|- bgcolor="ccffcc"
| 103 || July 31 || Astros || 10–0 || Smiley (10–9) || Wall || — || 26,082 || 52–51
|-

|- bgcolor="ccffcc"
| 104 || August 1 || @ Expos || 9–7 || Shaw (4–4) || Dyer || Brantley (29) || 13,725 || 53–51
|- bgcolor="ffbbbb"
| 105 || August 2 || @ Expos || 1–11 || Martinez || Jarvis (4–4) || — || 12,988 || 53–52
|- bgcolor="ffbbbb"
| 106 || August 3 || @ Expos || 2–6 || Cormier || Portugal (7–8) || Rojas || 17,184 || 53–53
|- bgcolor="ffbbbb"
| 107 || August 4 || @ Expos || 3–7 || Urbina || Burba (6–10) || Rojas || 15,408 || 53–54
|- bgcolor="ccffcc"
| 108 || August 5 || @ Giants || 4–3 || Salkeld (6–3) || VanLandingham || Brantley (30) || 12,277 || 54–54
|- bgcolor="ccffcc"
| 109 || August 6 || @ Giants || 3–2 || Carrasco (3–2) || Beck || Brantley (31) || 12,434 || 55–54
|- bgcolor="ffbbbb"
| 110 || August 7 || @ Giants || 2–9 || Gardner || Jarvis (4–5) || — || 15,829 || 55–55
|- bgcolor="ccffcc"
| 111 || August 9 || Dodgers || 9–4 || Portugal (8–8) || Valdez || — || 34,004 || 56–55
|- bgcolor="ffbbbb"
| 112 || August 10 || Dodgers || 5–7 || Nomo || Burba (6–11) || Worrell || 33,830 || 56–56
|- bgcolor="ffbbbb"
| 113 || August 11 || Dodgers || 5–10 || Osuna || Carrasco (3–3) || — || 27,897 || 56–57
|- bgcolor="ffbbbb"
| 114 || August 12 || Dodgers || 5–6 || Martinez || Smiley (10–10) || Worrell || 21,677 || 56–58
|- bgcolor="ccffcc"
| 115 || August 13 || Padres || 10–4 || Jarvis (5–5) || Hamilton || — || 20,205 || 57–58
|- bgcolor="ccffcc"
| 116 || August 14 || Padres || 2–1 (13) || Smith (3–2) || Bergman || — || 20,983 || 58–58
|- bgcolor="ccffcc"
| 117 || August 15 || Padres || 3–2 || Burba (7–11) || Tewksbury || Brantley (32) || 23,143 || 59–58
|- bgcolor="ffbbbb"
| 118 || August 16 || Rockies || 4–8 || Reynoso || Salkeld (6–4) || — || 28,878 || 59–59
|- bgcolor="ccffcc"
| 119 || August 17 || Rockies || 5–3 || Smiley (11–10) || Munoz || Brantley (33) || — || 60–59
|- bgcolor="ccffcc"
| 120 || August 17 || Rockies || 9–5 || Shaw (5–4) || Reed || — || 34,225 || 61–59
|- bgcolor="ccffcc"
| 121 || August 18 || Rockies || 9–4 || Jarvis (6–5) || Ritz || Shaw (3) || 24,883 || 62–59
|- bgcolor="ffbbbb"
| 122 || August 19 || Rockies || 3–6 || Thompson || Portugal (8–9) || — || 22,670 || 62–60
|- bgcolor="ffbbbb"
| 123 || August 20 || @ Braves || 1–4 || Glavine || Burba (7–12) || Wohlers || 32,658 || 62–61
|- bgcolor="ffbbbb"
| 124 || August 21 || @ Braves || 3–4 || Borbon || Brantley (1–2) || — || 29,213 || 62–62
|- bgcolor="ccffcc"
| 125 || August 22 || @ Braves || 3–2 (13) || Carrasco (4–3) || Borowski || Brantley (34) || 31,729 || 63–62
|- bgcolor="ccffcc"
| 126 || August 23 || @ Marlins || 6–5 || Carrara (1–0) || Valdes || Brantley (35) || — || 64–62
|- bgcolor="ffbbbb"
| 127 || August 23 || @ Marlins || 3–8 || Leiter || Jarvis (6–6) || — || 21,497 || 64–63
|- bgcolor="ffbbbb"
| 128 || August 24 || @ Marlins || 3–5 || Brown || Burba (7–13) || Nen || 33,883 || 64–64
|- bgcolor="ffbbbb"
| 129 || August 25 || @ Marlins || 5–6 || Nen || Smith (3–3) || — || 27,372 || 64–65
|- bgcolor="ffbbbb"
| 130 || August 26 || @ Rockies || 5–9 (7) || Swift || Jarvis (6–7) || Bailey || 48,093 || 64–66
|- bgcolor="ccffcc"
| 131 || August 27 || @ Rockies || 4–3 || Smiley (12–10) || Reynoso || Brantley (36) || 50,046 || 65–66
|- bgcolor="ffbbbb"
| 132 || August 28 || @ Rockies || 9–10 || Ruffin || Shaw (5–5) || — || 48,057 || 65–67
|- bgcolor="ccffcc"
| 133 || August 29 || @ Rockies || 18–7 || Burba (8–13) || Thompson || — || 48,029 || 66–67
|- bgcolor="ffbbbb"
| 134 || August 30 || Marlins || 1–3 || Brown || Remlinger (0–1) || — || 22,485 || 66–68
|- bgcolor="ccffcc"
| 135 || August 31 || Marlins || 22–8 || Jarvis (7–7) || Miller || — || 25,196 || 67–68
|-

|- bgcolor="ffbbbb"
| 136 || September 1 || Marlins || 1–6 || Hutton || Smiley (12–11) || — || 25,521 || 67–69
|- bgcolor="ccffcc"
| 137 || September 2 || Braves || 7–6 || Shaw (6–5) || McMichael || Brantley (37) || 20,879 || 68–69
|- bgcolor="ccffcc"
| 138 || September 3 || Braves || 5–1 || Burba (9–13) || Bielecki || Shaw (4) || 18,844 || 69–69
|- bgcolor="ccffcc"
| 139 || September 4 || Braves || 12–6 || Salkeld (7–4) || Glavine || — || 19,532 || 70–69
|- bgcolor="ffbbbb"
| 140 || September 6 || Giants || 0–2 || Fernandez || Smiley (12–12) || Beck || — || 70–70
|- bgcolor="ccffcc"
| 141 || September 6 || Giants || 14–1 || Morgan (1–0) || Bourgeois || — || 23,091 || 71–70
|- bgcolor="ccffcc"
| 142 || September 7 || Giants || 7–5 || Salkeld (8–4) || Scott || Brantley (38) || 22,790 || 72–70
|- bgcolor="ccffcc"
| 143 || September 8 || Giants || 8–3 || Shaw (7–5) || Bautista || — || 20,838 || 73–70
|- bgcolor="ffbbbb"
| 144 || September 9 || @ Dodgers || 2–7 || Martinez || Jarvis (7–8) || — || 29,081 || 73–71
|- bgcolor="ffbbbb"
| 145 || September 10 || @ Dodgers || 4–5 || Candiotti || Salkeld (8–5) || Worrell || 28,237 || 73–72
|- bgcolor="ffbbbb"
| 146 || September 11 || @ Dodgers || 2–3 || Valdez || Smiley (12–13) || Worrell || 27,527 || 73–73
|- bgcolor="ccffcc"
| 147 || September 13 || @ Padres || 3–1 || Morgan (2–0) || Ashby || Brantley (39) || 26,524 || 74–73
|- bgcolor="ffbbbb"
| 148 || September 14 || @ Padres || 2–3 (12) || Veras || Smith (3–4) || — || 25,231 || 74–74
|- bgcolor="ffbbbb"
| 149 || September 15 || @ Padres || 0–8 || Hamilton || Jarvis (7–9) || Blair || 29,005 || 74–75
|- bgcolor="ffbbbb"
| 150 || September 17 || @ Pirates || 3–5 || Cordova || Smiley (12–14) || Ericks || 7,551 || 74–76
|- bgcolor="ffbbbb"
| 151 || September 18 || @ Pirates || 3–5 || Schmidt || Morgan (2–1) || Plesac || 7,924 || 74–77
|- bgcolor="ffbbbb"
| 152 || September 19 || @ Pirates || 4–6 || Peters || Pugh (1–1) || Ericks || 10,188 || 74–78
|- bgcolor="ccffcc"
| 153 || September 20 || Cardinals || 4–2 || Burba (10–13) || Benes || Brantley (40) || 23,496 || 75–78
|- bgcolor="ccffcc"
| 154 || September 22 || Cardinals || 6–3 || Shaw (8–5) || Mathews || Brantley (41) || — || 76–78
|- bgcolor="ccffcc"
| 155 || September 22 || Cardinals || 6–0 || Smiley (13–14) || Jackson || — || 38,225 || 77–78
|- bgcolor="ffbbbb"
| 156 || September 23 || Cardinals || 2–3 || Stottlemyre || Morgan (2–2) || Eckersley || 17,313 || 77–79
|- bgcolor="ccffcc"
| 157 || September 24 || Cubs || 6–3 || Lyons (1–0) || Navarro || Brantley (42) || 18,584 || 78–79
|- bgcolor="ccffcc"
| 158 || September 25 || Cubs || 4–3 || Burba (11–13) || Foster || Brantley (43) || 18,506 || 79–79
|- bgcolor="ccffcc"
| 159 || September 26 || Cubs || 12–4 || Jarvis (8–9) || Swartzbaugh || — || 20,777 || 80–79
|- bgcolor="ffbbbb"
| 160 || September 27 || @ Cardinals || 1–2 (11) || Batchelor || Shaw (8–6) || — || 39,730 || 80–80
|- bgcolor="ffbbbb"
| 161 || September 28 || @ Cardinals || 2–5 || Jackson || Morgan (2–3) || Honeycutt || 52,876 || 80–81
|- bgcolor="ccffcc"
| 162 || September 29 || @ Cardinals || 6–3 || Lyons (2–0) || Ludwick || Brantley (44) || 51,379 || 81–81
|-

|-
| Legend:       = Win       = LossBold = Reds team member

Detailed records

Notable transactions
 April 2, 1996: Scott Service was signed as a free agent with the Cincinnati Reds.
 May 27, 1996: Lee Smith was traded by the California Angels to the Cincinnati Reds for Chuck McElroy.
June 18, 1996: Vince Coleman was released by the Cincinnati Reds.
 July 30, 1996: Kevin Mitchell was traded by the Boston Red Sox to the Cincinnati Reds for Roberto Mejía and Brad Tweedie (minors).
July 30, 1996: Eric Anthony was purchased by the Colorado Rockies from the Cincinnati Reds.

Draft picks
June 4, 1996: Buddy Carlyle was drafted by the Cincinnati Reds in the 2nd round of the 1996 amateur draft. Player signed June 21, 1996.

Roster

Player stats

Batting

Starters by position 
Note: Pos = Position; G = Games played; AB = At bats; H = Hits; Avg. = Batting average; HR = Home runs; RBI = Runs batted in

Other batters 
Note: G = Games played; AB = At bats; H = Hits; Avg. = Batting average; HR = Home runs; RBI = Runs batted in

Pitching

Starting pitchers 
Note: G = Games pitched; IP = Innings pitched; W = Wins; L = Losses; ERA = Earned run average; SO = Strikeouts

Other pitchers 
Note: G = Games pitched; IP = Innings pitched; W = Wins; L = Losses; ERA = Earned run average; SO = Strikeouts

Relief pitchers 
Note: G = Games pitched; W = Wins; L = Losses; SV = Saves; ERA = Earned run average; SO = Strikeouts

Farm system

References

1996 Cincinnati Reds season at Baseball Reference

Cincinnati Reds seasons
Cincinnati Reds season
Cinc